The Star was an America automobile marque that was assembled by the Durant Motors Company between 1922 and 1928. Also known as the Star Car, Star was envisioned as a competitor against the Ford Model T and Chevrolet.  In the United Kingdom, it was sold as the Rugby, to avoid confusion with the British marque.

History

Like other products of the Durant Motors Company, the Star was an "assembled car", built from parts supplied by various outside companies. Originally, Stars were powered by a four-cylinder engine.  In 1926, the line introduced a six-cylinder engine. All factory-installed engines were built by Continental. Durant was Continentals biggest customer in the 1920's taking up to 85% of its output.

Star cars were first produced in Durant's Long Island City plant before production moved to the new factory in Elizabeth, New Jersey.  Star would also be manufactured in other Durant factories in Lansing, Michigan, Oakland, California and Toronto, Ontario.

Star was planned to undercut Chevrolet prices and match Ford prices, starting in 1922 at $348 for a touring car, Ford slashed prices by $50 in mid 1923, which Star could not match.  Star was able to match Chevrolet prices during most of its life, ranging from $443 in 1923 to $525 in 1927 for a touring car.

In 1923, Star became the first car company to offer a production station wagon. Instead of shipping a chassis out to a custom builder, who added a wooden wagon body, the wagon body was delivered to the Star factory and fitted to the chassis there.

For the early part of the 1928 model year, the Star was known as the Durant Star and was only available with a four-cylinder engine.  The car was replaced in the latter half of the 1928 model year by the Durant 4.

Production from 1923 to 1928 totaled 358,689 vehicles.

Models
 Star Two Door Sedan

Star offered light commercial vehicles derived from the passenger cars.

See also
 Durant Motors

References

External links
List of Star models
Star catalog at durantcars.net
Durant Motors Automobile Club

Defunct motor vehicle manufacturers of the United States
Durant Motors

Vehicle manufacturing companies established in 1922
Vehicle manufacturing companies disestablished in 1928
Cars introduced in 1922
1920s cars
Vintage vehicles
Motor vehicle manufacturers based in New Jersey